The Kodak Pixpro S-1 is a rangefinder-styled digital mirrorless camera announced on January 7, 2014, and first shipped in August 2014. It is the first interchangeable lens camera made under the Kodak brand since JK Imaging bought the rights to "manufacture and sell Kodak branded digital imaging products", as described in promotional materials. Kodak is one of the original members of the Micro Four Thirds standard but had never before produced a camera for it. The camera is produced in partnership with Asia Optical.

The entry level Kodak Pixpro S-1 is the competitor of Olympus PEN E-PL5 and Panasonic Lumix DMC-GF6 and comes with dual kit lenses SZ ED 12-45mm f/3.5-6.3 AF zoom and SZ ED 42.5-160mm f/3.9-5.9 AF telezoom. JK Imaging also launched SL 400mm F6.7 Fieldscope lenses around the same time. The first lens is not so compact as other manufacturer's lenses, but has advantages with dual kit lenses, has time lapse, also for video, built-in image stabilization and 360 degrees panorama. Being a Micro Four Thirds camera, the S-1 is also compatible with all other lenses within that system, but not for the accessories, such flash, etc.

See also
 Kodak PixPro AZ521

References

External links
 Kodak Pixpro S1 specifications

Live-preview digital cameras
Micro Four Thirds system